The Meishe River is a river within Haikou City, Hainan, China. Its source is the spillway at the east end of the Shapo Reservoir located just south of the city. The Meishe flows eastward under Longkun Road south of the Haikou East Railway Station. It then turns north, past the Meishe River National Wetland Park and winds northward through the east side of urban Haikou, under Guoxing Avenue, finally emptying into the Haidian River just east of Heping Bridge.

References

External links
 

 

Rivers of Hainan
Haikou